Derk Jan van Egmond (born 30 August 1956 in Hellendoorn) is a Dutch track cyclist. He competed in the men's points race at the 1984 Summer Olympics in Los Angeles, finishing in eighth place.

See also
 List of Dutch Olympic cyclists

References

1956 births
Living people
Dutch male cyclists
Olympic cyclists of the Netherlands
Cyclists at the 1984 Summer Olympics
People from Hellendoorn
Cyclists from Overijssel